The following are the winners of the 35th annual (2008) Origins Award, presented at the 2009 Origins Game Fair

References

2008 awards
 
2008 awards in the United States